Events in the year 1312 in Norway.

Incumbents
Monarch: Haakon V Magnusson

Events
Ingeborg of Norway and Eric Magnusson were married in a double wedding in Oslo; at the same time, her cousin Ingeborg Eriksdottir of Norway, married Eric's brother duke Valdemar Magnusson.
29 October – the Treaty of Inverness between Robert the Bruce of Scotland and Haakon V of Norway reaffirmed the Treaty of Perth (1266).  Bruce personally represented Scotland at Inverness.

Deaths
1 May – Euphemia of Rügen, Queen consort (born c.1280).

References

Norway